The 1990 Tour de Romandie was the 44th edition of the Tour de Romandie cycle race and was held from 8 May to 13 May 1990. The race started in Moutier and finished in Geneva. The race was won by Charly Mottet of the RMO team.

General classification

References

1990
Tour de Romandie